Alan D Bradley (born 1926) is a former international lawn bowler who competed for Rhodesia.

Bowls career
He won two bronze medals in the fours and singles competitions at the Commonwealth Games. They came in the 1954 British Empire and Commonwealth Games in Vancouver and the 1962 British Empire and Commonwealth Games in Perth.

Personal life
His father Charles 'Stewart' Bradley was a Rhodesian international lawn bowler and he was a civil engineer by trade.

References

1926 births
Possibly living people
Zimbabwean male bowls players
Bowls players at the 1954 British Empire and Commonwealth Games
Bowls players at the 1962 British Empire and Commonwealth Games
Commonwealth Games bronze medallists for Southern Rhodesia
Commonwealth Games bronze medallists for Rhodesia and Nyasaland
Commonwealth Games medallists in lawn bowls
Medallists at the 1954 British Empire and Commonwealth Games
Medallists at the 1962 British Empire and Commonwealth Games